The montane rock-skink, mountain egernia or mountain skink (Liopholis montana) is a species of skink, a lizard in the family Scincidae. The species is endemic to southeastern Australia.

References

Skinks of Australia
Liopholis
Reptiles described in 2002